Illinois Route 250 is an east–west state highway in southeastern Illinois. It is similar to Illinois Route 251 in that portions of the highway replace former alignments of U.S. Route 50. Illinois 250 has its western terminus west of the city limits of Noble and its eastern terminus at U.S. Route 50 Business in Lawrenceville.

Route description 
Illinois 250 serves the downtown areas of five population centers in southeast Illinois: Noble, Olney, Sumner, Bridgeport and Lawrenceville; the largest of these centers is
Olney with 8,631 people as of the year 2000. Both Lawrenceville and Olney are county seats of Lawrence and Richland counties, respectively. All of the population centers are feeder cities to Vincennes, which has a population of 18,071 and is the commercial center of the region.

History 
U.S. Route 50 was upgraded to a divided highway in this area (portions of which were limited-access highway) from the mid-1960s into the 1970s. Illinois 250 has been used to designate the U.S. Route 50 business routes into these cities since 1965.

Major intersections

References

External links 
Illinois Highway Ends: Illinois Route 250

250
U.S. Route 50
Transportation in Richland County, Illinois
Transportation in Lawrence County, Illinois